This is a list of regiments from the state of Tennessee that fought in the Union Army during the American Civil War (1861–1865). The list of Tennessee Confederate Civil War units is shown separately. Although Tennessee was officially a Confederate state in the conflict, the state would furnish the most units of soldiers for the Union Army than any other state within the Confederacy, totaling approximately 31,092 white troops and 20,133 black troops.

Artillery
 1st Regiment Tennessee Heavy Artillery (African Descent)
 2nd Regiment Tennessee Heavy Artillery (African Descent)
 1st Battalion, Tennessee Light Artillery
 1st Battalion Tennessee Light Artillery, Battery "A"
 1st Battalion Tennessee Light Artillery, Battery "B"
 1st Battalion Tennessee Light Artillery, Battery "C"
 1st Battalion Tennessee Light Artillery, Battery "D"
 1st Battalion Tennessee Light Artillery, Battery "E"
 1st Battalion Tennessee Light Artillery, Battery "F"
 1st Battalion Tennessee Light Artillery, Battery "G"
 1st Battalion Tennessee Light Artillery, Battery "K"
 Memphis Battery Light Artillery (African Descent)

Cavalry
 1st Regiment Tennessee Volunteer Cavalry
 2nd Regiment Tennessee Volunteer Cavalry
 3rd Regiment Tennessee Volunteer Cavalry
 4th Regiment Tennessee Volunteer Cavalry
 5th Regiment Tennessee Volunteer Cavalry (1st Middle Tennessee Volunteer Cavalry)
 6th Regiment Tennessee Volunteer Cavalry (1st West Tennessee Volunteer Cavalry)
 7th Regiment Tennessee Volunteer Cavalry (2nd West Tennessee Volunteer Cavalry)
 8th Regiment Tennessee Volunteer Cavalry
 9th Regiment Tennessee Volunteer Cavalry
 10th Regiment Tennessee Volunteer Cavalry
 11th Regiment Tennessee Volunteer Cavalry
 12th Regiment Tennessee Volunteer Cavalry
 13th Regiment Tennessee Volunteer Cavalry
 14th Regiment Tennessee Volunteer Cavalry - failed to complete organization
 Bradford's Battalion Tennessee Cavalry (13th West Tennessee Volunteer Cavalry)
 1st Tennessee & Alabama Independent Vidette Cavalry

Infantry
 1st Regiment Tennessee Volunteer Infantry (1st East Tennessee Infantry)
 2nd Regiment Tennessee Volunteer Infantry (2nd East Tennessee Infantry)
 3rd Regiment Tennessee Volunteer Infantry
 4th Regiment Tennessee Volunteer Infantry
 5th Regiment Tennessee Volunteer Infantry
 6th Regiment Tennessee Volunteer Infantry
 7th Regiment Tennessee Volunteer Infantry
 8th Regiment Tennessee Volunteer Infantry
 9th Regiment Tennessee Volunteer Infantry
 10th Regiment Tennessee Volunteer Infantry (1st Middle Tennessee Infantry)
 Nashville Union Guards

Mounted Infantry
 1st Regiment Tennessee Mounted Infantry
 2nd Regiment Tennessee Mounted Infantry
 3rd Regiment Tennessee Mounted Infantry
 4th Regiment Tennessee Mounted Infantry
 5th Regiment Tennessee Mounted Infantry
 6th Regiment Tennessee Mounted Infantry
 7th Regiment Tennessee Mounted Infantry
 8th Regiment Tennessee Mounted Infantry

African-American Infantry
 1st Regiment Tennessee Infantry (African Descent)
 2nd Regiment Tennessee Infantry (African Descent)

Militia
 1st Regiment Tennessee Enrolled Militia Infantry
 2nd Regiment Tennessee Enrolled Militia Infantry
 3rd Regiment Tennessee Enrolled Militia Infantry
 4th Regiment Tennessee Enrolled Militia Infantry

See also
 Lists of American Civil War Regiments by State
 Southern Unionists
 United States Colored Troops

References

 The Civil War Archive

 
Tennessee
Civil War